H-factor is a kinetic model for the rate of delignification in kraft pulping. It is a single variable model combining temperature (T) and time (t) and assuming that the delignification is one single reaction.

References

Papermaking